Compound Media (formerly The Anthony Cumia Network) is a subscription-based on-demand streaming media platform that broadcasts live American audio and video podcasts. It launched on August 4, 2014 by its founder, radio personality and broadcaster Anthony Cumia, who began hosting The Anthony Cumia Show on the network after his firing from SiriusXM. Since its launch, the network has grown to host additional shows, including those hosted by Bill Schulz, Joanne Nosuchinsky, Kevin Brennan, Michael Malice, Pat Dixon, Don Jamieson, Chrissie Mayr, Gavin McInnes, and Geno Bisconte. In 2016, The Anthony Cumia Network relaunched as Compound Media.

History

Background

On July 3, 2014, radio personality Anthony Cumia was fired by the satellite radio provider SiriusXM after he posted a series of racially-charged and hate-filled tweets. The tweets were about a black woman who Cumia said had punched him after objecting to him taking pictures of her in Times Square in New York City. At the time of his firing, Cumia gave his blessing for his radio co-hosts, Gregg "Opie" Hughes and Jim Norton of Opie and Anthony, to continue broadcasting without him, acknowledging the pair's obligation to fulfill their contracts. Hughes and Norton began their new show, Opie with Jim Norton, on July 14 before the channel was renamed from The Opie and Anthony Channel to SiriusXM Talk.

On July 8, 2014, Cumia announced the launch of his new audio and video podcast The Anthony Cumia Show on his new on-demand streaming media platform The Anthony Cumia Network, with subscribers paying monthly or annual fees to access content. Cumia had occasionally broadcast live video streams from his custom built basement studio at his Roslyn Heights, New York home on UStream named Live From the Compound from 2012 to 2014, initially as a hobby and were casual in nature. In the wake of his firing, Cumia said, he "was able to just get servers and be able to feed that show out to the public without having to start from scratch", allowing him to launch within weeks.

Launch and developments

On August 4, 2014, The Anthony Cumia Show began airing, Monday through Thursday. During the opening months some shows aired from Cumia's basement studio, by his home bar, or in his garden. In November 2014, Cumia said the network had over 40,000 paid subscribers.

On March 10, 2015, the Legion of Skanks (Big Jay Oakerson, Dave Smith, and Luis J. Gomez) hosted a podcast after The Anthony Cumia Show. Starting in June 2015 subscribers also gained access to the Legion of Skanks, making it the first podcast to join The Anthony Cumia Network full-time. The show aired on Tuesdays and Wednesdays at 9pm. As Gomez described it in 2016, "When you come to watch the Legion of Skanks show, you should be hearing racist, sexist, offensive shit. If you’re upset about that, don’t watch the show." The show announced on May 16, 2016, that it would be leaving the network May 31.

Gavin McInnes launched The Gavin McInnes Show on the network on June 15, 2015, airing Monday through Thursday. The idea for the Proud Boys, which McInnes founded, originated in "the Compound", Cumia's mansion, around 2016. Cumia has said that it began as a prank on a Compound Media employee that "mutated" and "it was never supposed to go any further than that". In monologues on his show, McInnes publicized the Proud Boys and laid out the group's ideology of Western chauvinism. He praised right-wing violence and regularly used racial slurs. Among his guests were far-right figures Milo Yiannopoulos, Richard Spencer, Jason Kessler, Christopher Cantwell, Mike Cernovich, Faith Goldy, Roosh V, and former Ku Klux Klan leader David Duke. He also mingled with comedians considered more mainstream.

In 2016, The Anthony Cumia Network relaunched as Compound Media. Redbar Radio, hosted by Mike David, first aired on the network on November 2, 2016. The show then aired every Friday at 4pm for eleven weeks, until creative differences led David to announce via Twitter on January 17, 2017 that he had decided to take his show off the network.

Author Michael Malice joined Compound Media on June 7, 2017, with the launch of the "YOUR WELCOME" with Michael Malice podcast. The podcast was put on hold in 2018 with the launch of a new show titled Night Shade.

On August 21, 2017, Cumia announced the addition of comedian and actor Artie Lange as the co-host of his show, The Artie and Anthony Show. The show aired on Monday to Thursday, from 4–6 p.m., starting September 5, 2017.

On October 2, 2017, Mornin'! with Bill Schulz launched as the network's new morning show. 2013 Miss New York USA winner and former Red Eye w/ Tom Shillue panelist Joanne Nosuchinsky joined Mornin! in February 2018.

In May 2018, it was announced that due to his health and legal issues, Lange would be taking an indefinite hiatus from the show, and it would revert to the name The Anthony Cumia Show, with third mic Dave Landau continuing as co-host.

On June 4, 2019, the heavy metal music talk show That Jamieson Show launched, featuring comedian and That Metal Show co-host Don Jamieson.

In February 2021, The Anthony Cumia Show co-host Dave Landau left Compound Media to join Steven Crowder's show, Louder with Crowder.

On March 31, 2021, Cumia launched a second show, replacing his The Anthony Cumia Show Wednesday show, titled Compound Censored, with Gavin McInnes as his co-host. The show's title is a portmanteau which combines Compound Media with McInnes' subscription-based network Censored.TV, where the show also broadcasts.

Shows

References

External links
Compound Media

2014 establishments in the United States
Mass media companies based in New York City
Mass media companies established in 2014
Podcasting companies